Chris Langford (born 2 January 1963) is a former professional Australian rules footballer who has been an AFL Commissioner since 1999.

Player
Langford is best known for his 303-game career for the Hawthorn Football Club between 1983 and 1997.

Langford played his early games for Hawthorn on the wing or as the second ruckman. He had a good leap, which compensated for his lack of height. It was after the retirement of Peter Knights and David O'Halloran that he switched to full-back. It was that position in which he won his first All-Australian selection in 1987.

A defender, Langford won four premierships with Hawthorn, in 1986, 1988, 1989 and 1991. He captained the club in the 1994 season and earned a second All-Australian selection.

He holds a place on the interchange bench in Hawthorn's Team of the Century.

Late in his career, Langford moved to Sydney where he "did a Minton", working as an accountant and commuting to Melbourne to train and play with his club. In 2012, he moved back to Melbourne.

Merger game
Langford's antics at the end of the merger game against Melbourne in 1996 inspired many Hawthorn members to vote against the merger proposal. Langford (Hawthorn's full-back) took off his Hawthorn jumper and proudly held it above his head while leaving the field. Langford was only one of the active playing list to display his disapproval of the plan.

Statistics

|-
|- style="background-color: #EAEAEA"
! scope="row" style="text-align:center" | 1983
|style="text-align:center;"|
| 28 || 11 || 3 || 9 || 105 || 66 || 171 || 39 ||  || 0.3 || 0.8 || 9.5 || 6.0 || 15.5 || 3.5 ||  || 0
|-
! scope="row" style="text-align:center" | 1984
|style="text-align:center;"|
| 28 || 22 || 17 || 19 || 185 || 62 || 247 || 54 ||  || 0.8 || 0.9 || 8.4 || 2.8 || 11.2 || 2.5 ||  || 1
|- style="background-color: #EAEAEA"
! scope="row" style="text-align:center" | 1985
|style="text-align:center;"|
| 28 || 22 || 2 || 7 || 190 || 74 || 264 || 62 ||  || 0.1 || 0.3 || 8.6 || 3.4 || 12.0 || 2.8 ||  || 0
|-
|style="text-align:center;background:#afe6ba;"|1986†
|style="text-align:center;"|
| 28 || 23 || 0 || 0 || 216 || 96 || 312 || 64 ||  || 0.0 || 0.0 || 9.4 || 4.2 || 13.6 || 2.8 ||  || 5
|- style="background-color: #EAEAEA"
! scope="row" style="text-align:center" | 1987
|style="text-align:center;"|
| 24 || 26 || 1 || 2 || 265 || 114 || 379 || 98 || 26 || 0.0 || 0.1 || 10.2 || 4.4 || 14.6 || 3.8 || 1.0 || 0
|-
|style="text-align:center;background:#afe6ba;"|1988†
|style="text-align:center;"|
| 24 || 22 || 2 || 1 || 223 || 77 || 300 || 75 || 16 || 0.1 || 0.0 || 10.1 || 3.5 || 13.6 || 3.4 || 0.7 || 5
|- style="background-color: #EAEAEA"
|style="text-align:center;background:#afe6ba;"|1989†
|style="text-align:center;"|
| 24 || 23 || 0 || 1 || 216 || 96 || 312 || 82 || 19 || 0.0 || 0.0 || 9.4 || 4.2 || 13.6 || 3.6 || 0.8 || 2
|-
! scope="row" style="text-align:center" | 1990
|style="text-align:center;"|
| 24 || 20 || 2 || 0 || 164 || 68 || 232 || 62 || 13 || 0.1 || 0.0 || 8.2 || 3.4 || 11.6 || 3.1 || 0.7 || 3
|- style="background-color: #EAEAEA"
|style="text-align:center;background:#afe6ba;"|1991†
|style="text-align:center;"|
| 24 || 25 || 0 || 0 || 231 || 86 || 317 || 72 || 29 || 0.0 || 0.0 || 9.2 || 3.4 || 12.7 || 2.9 || 1.2 || 2
|-
! scope="row" style="text-align:center" | 1992
|style="text-align:center;"|
| 24 || 23 || 4 || 0 || 185 || 79 || 264 || 49 || 20 || 0.2 || 0.0 || 8.0 || 3.4 || 11.5 || 2.1 || 0.9 || 0
|- style="background-color: #EAEAEA"
! scope="row" style="text-align:center" | 1993
|style="text-align:center;"|
| 24 || 21 || 0 || 0 || 192 || 85 || 277 || 50 || 38 || 0.0 || 0.0 || 9.1 || 4.0 || 13.2 || 2.4 || 1.8 || 4
|-
! scope="row" style="text-align:center" | 1994
|style="text-align:center;"|
| 24 || 18 || 0 || 3 || 132 || 87 || 219 || 64 || 22 || 0.0 || 0.2 || 7.3 || 4.8 || 12.2 || 3.6 || 1.2 || 11
|- style="background-color: #EAEAEA"
! scope="row" style="text-align:center" | 1995
|style="text-align:center;"|
| 24 || 18 || 0 || 1 || 160 || 79 || 239 || 54 || 21 || 0.0 || 0.1 || 8.9 || 4.4 || 13.3 || 3.0 || 1.2 || 2
|-
! scope="row" style="text-align:center" | 1996
|style="text-align:center;"|
| 24 || 21 || 1 || 0 || 248 || 58 || 306 || 97 || 30 || 0.0 || 0.0 || 11.8 || 2.8 || 14.6 || 4.6 || 1.4 || 3
|- style="background-color: #EAEAEA"
! scope="row" style="text-align:center" | 1997
|style="text-align:center;"|
| 24 || 8 || 1 || 2 || 77 || 21 || 98 || 32 || 6 || 0.1 || 0.3 || 9.6 || 2.6 || 12.3 || 4.0 || 0.8 || 0
|- class="sortbottom"
! colspan=3| Career
! 303
! 33
! 45
! 2789
! 1148
! 3937
! 954
! 240
! 0.1
! 0.1
! 9.2
! 3.8
! 13.0
! 3.1
! 1.1
! 38
|}

Career
After his career, he moved into game administration and was appointed to the AFL Commission in 1999.

Family

Chris' son Will was recruited to Hawthorn in the 2011 Rookie draft, and was upgraded to the Hawthorn senior list in June 2013. Will played in the 2014 premiership with the Hawks, with the Langfords becoming the second father/son premiership players at the club after Peter and Paul Hudson in 1971 and 1991 respectively. His son Lachlan was selected in the 2014 rookie draft.

References

External links

1963 births
People educated at Melbourne Grammar School
Living people
Australian rules footballers from Victoria (Australia)
Hawthorn Football Club players
Hawthorn Football Club Premiership players
All-Australians (1953–1988)
Victorian State of Origin players
Australian Football Hall of Fame inductees
All-Australians (AFL)
E. J. Whitten Medal winners
Australia international rules football team players
Four-time VFL/AFL Premiership players
VFL/AFL administrators